Robert Bolton was a unionist politician in Northern Ireland.

He was a Democratic Unionist Party member of Coleraine Borough Council from 1981 to 1989, and 1993 to 2001. He stood unsuccessfully as an independent candidate at the 2001 election to the council.

He was elected to the Northern Ireland Forum in 1996

References

Living people
Democratic Unionist Party councillors
Members of the Northern Ireland Forum
Year of birth missing (living people)
Members of Coleraine Borough Council